Hareh Bagh-e Khayyat (Romanized Persian: Hareh Bāgh-e Khayyāţ; also Hareh Bāgh, Har Bāgh, Har Bāgh-e Khayyāţ, and Harreh Bāgh) is a village in Firuzabad Rural District, Firuzabad District, Selseleh County, Lorestan Province, Iran. At the 2006 census, the village's population was 220, having 46 families.

References 

Towns and villages in Selseleh County